E.T.W. is End Time Warriors' debut album released in 1989 through ForeFront Records.

Track listing

1989 debut albums
End Time Warriors albums